List of heads of government of Cabinda (Angola)

(Dates in italics indicate de facto continuation of office)

Affiliations

See also 
Angola
Heads of state of Cabinda
List of colonial and provincial heads of Cabinda
Heads of state of Angola
Heads of government of Angola
Prime Minister of Angola
President of Angola
Colonial heads of Angola
Lists of office-holders

Republic of Cabinda
Heads of government of former unrecognized countries